Itha Oru Dhikkari is a 1981 Indian Malayalam film, directed by N. P. Suresh and produced by Purushan Alappuzha. The film stars Prem Nazir, Jayabharathi, Srividya and Sukumaran in the lead roles. The film has musical score by A. T. Ummer.

Cast
Prem Nazir as Ravi
Jayabharathi as Ramani
Srividya as Ammini
Sukumaran as Suku
Balan K. Nair as Panikkar
M. G. Soman as Raju
Mala Aravindan as Kumar
 Janardhanan as Kurup
Sathyakala
 Kaduvakulam Antony as Keshavan
 Subhashini 
Manochithra
 Cochin Haneefa as Shekaran
 Meena
 Devi
 Sujithra

Soundtrack
The music was composed by A. T. Ummer and the lyrics were written by Poovachal Khader.

References

External links
 

1981 films
1980s Malayalam-language films
Films directed by N. P. Suresh